Sophie Cadieux (born August 25, 1977) is a Canadian actress from Quebec. She is most noted for her role as Valérie Danault in the television series Lâcher prise, for which she won the Prix Gémeaux for Best Actress in a Comedy Series in 2017, 2018 and 2020.

She studied theater at the Conservatoire d'art dramatique de Montréal from 1998 to 2001. She has an improvisational theater background from her time in the Quebec improvisational leagues of the Mouvement d'improvisation de Montmorency (MIM), the Limonade, the Ligue d'improvisation montréalaise (LIM), the Cravates, and the renowned Ligue nationale d'improvisation (LNI).

Honours

Awards 
 Prix Gémeau for best interpretation in a supporting role of a youth television program (for her work in Watatatow, 2004)
 Pierre Curzi Trophy for rookie of the year of the Ligue nationale d'improvisation (2002)

Nominations 
 Prix Gémeau for best interpretation in a supporting role of a youth television program (for her work in Watatatow, 2003)

Theater work 
Toccate et Fugue (Centre du Théâtre d'Aujourd'hui, 2017)
Betty à la plage (Maison de la Culture, 2003; Théâtre La Licorne, 2004)
Cette fille-là (Licorne, 2004–2006; Quebec-wide tour, 2006)
Les Belles-soeurs (Théâtre Profusion, 2003)
Unity 1918 (Théâtre Espace Go, 2003)
Bouba Bouba (SMCQ, 2002–2003)
Les femmes de bonne humeur (Salle Fred Barry, 2002)
Avec le soleil, ...la mère (Théâtre du Tandem, 2001)
Le bourgeois gentilhomme (Centre d’Art d’Orford, 2001)
Théâtre de rue en France (Théâtre de l'Astheure, 2000)
Théâtre de rue Espagne (Théâtre de l'Escargot, 2000)

Filmography

Movies 
Quatres personnes ordinaires dans une mini-fourgonnette standard - 1999
Écrase bonhomme, t'es dans l'coup - 2000
Les petits Cagney - 2001
Duo - 2003
Funkytown - 2010
Silence Lies (Tromper le silence) - 2010
Suspicions (Jaloux) - 2010
An Extraordinary Person (Quelqu'un d'extraordinaire) - 2013
Snowtime! - 2015
9 (9, le film) - 2016

Television 
Fortier III (2001)
Café Bédé (2001)
Watatatow (2001–2002)
Rumeurs (2002–2003)
Temps dur (2003)
La chambre No 13 (2004)
Il était une fois dans le trouble (2004)
La Job (2006)
Tactik (2007)
Fred's Head (2008)
Les Lavigueur, la vraie histoire - 2008
Adam et Ève (2012)
Lâcher prise (2017-2020)

See also 
List of Quebec actors
Ligue nationale d'improvisation
Television of Quebec
Culture of Quebec

References

External links

1977 births
Living people
French Quebecers
Canadian television actresses
Canadian stage actresses
Canadian film actresses
Actresses from Quebec